The presidential transition of Luiz Inácio Lula da Silva's second presidency officially began on November 3, 2022, and ended with his inauguration on January 1, 2023. Then vice president-elect Geraldo Alckmin was appointed as the chair of Lula's transition team on November 1, 2022.

Background
Following the results of the 2022 Brazilian general election on October 30, president-elect Lula's campaign team expressed concern about incumbent president Jair Bolsonaro's 44-hour delay in recognizing the results of the polls and authorizing the start of the government transition. The green light was given only on November 2 by Bolsonaro's Chief of Staff of the Presidency, Ciro Nogueira.

Timeline

Post-election
October 30: Lula is declared the winner of the election.
October 31: President Bolsonaro refuses to accept the elections results.
November 1: Vice president-elect Alckmin appointed as the chair of Lula's transition team.
November 2: Bolsonaro avoids conceding but authorizes the beginning of transition, as pro-Bolsonaro demonstrations blocked access to airports and highways.
November 3: President Bolsonaro met vice president-elect Alckmin at the Planalto Palace.

Establishment of the transition team
The transition team was appointed by Lula since the day after the elections with more than fifty Brazilian officials led by some names that will compose the new administration as ministers. The national president of the Workers' Party, Gleisi Hoffmann, and the former minister, Aloizio Mercadante, were chosen as co-chairs of the transition team.

Transition team

Other transition team appointments
, economist
Guilherme Mello, economist

Advisory council
The advisory council is composed of several officials who helped to write the Lula's administration program, including:
Celso Amorim, former Minister of Foreign Affairs
Fernando Haddad, former Minister of Education
Jaques Wagner, former Minister of Defence
Carlos Lupi, former Minister of Labour
Simone Tebet, member of the Federal Senate
Marina Silva, former Minister of the Environment
, former Secretary General of the Presidency of the Republic
, former Secretary General of the Presidency of the Republic

Planned executive decisions
Lula's administration planned several decisions reversing those made by Bolsonaro's administration, including:

Withdraw from the Geneva Consensus Declaration
Rejoin the Union of South American Nations and the Community of Latin American and Caribbean States
Restore recognition of Nicolás Maduro as president of Venezuela and reopen the Brazilian embassy in Caracas
Restore goals of reduction of greenhouse gas emissions according to the Paris Agreement
Restore monitoring against deforestation of the Amazon rainforest
Relaunch the Growth Acceleration Program
Relaunch the Minha Casa, Minha Vida program

See also
2022 Brazilian election protests
Argentina presidential transition
Spanish presidential transition
United States presidential transition

References

External links
 

2022 establishments in Brazil
2023 disestablishments in Brazil
2022 in Brazilian politics
2023 in Brazilian politics
October 2022 events in Brazil
November 2022 events in Brazil
December 2022 events in Brazil
January 2023 events in Brazil
Silva
Luiz Inácio Lula da Silva